Marvin Galbraith Barrett (May 6, 1920 – August 19, 2006) was an American author and educator known as an authority on broadcast journalism.

Barrett was born in Des Moines, Iowa. His father, Edwin, was a radio actor and taught communications at Drake University. Barrett graduated from Harvard University in 1942. He served in the United States Navy from 1942 to 1946. In 1952 Barrett married Mary Ellin Berlin, daughter of Irving Berlin.

Barrett worked as a contributing editor to TIME and Newsweek magazines, executive editor of Show Business Illustrated, and managing editor of Show Magazine.

For many years, Barrett was the director of the DuPont-Columbia Survey of Broadcast Journalism. He received the Sigma Delta Chi Award for distinguished journalism for its 1975 report Moments of Truth.

A near death experience in 1984 inspired Barrett to keep journals, and resulted in his 1999 book Second Chance: A Life After Death.

Barrett died in Manhattan as a result of congestive heart failure.

Bibliography
Meet Thomas Jefferson (1967, Random House Children's Books)
The Politics of Broadcasting (1973, Crowell)
Moments of Truth (1975, Crowell)
The End of the Party (1976, Putnam)
Rich News, Poor News (1978, Crowell)
The Eye of the Storm (with Zachary Sklar, 1980, Lippincott & Crowell)
Broadcast Journalism, 1979-1981 (editor, 1982, Everest House)
Spare Days (1988, Arbor House)
Second Chance: A Life After Death (1999, Parabola)

References

1920 births
2006 deaths
Harvard University alumni
People from Des Moines, Iowa
20th-century American male writers
United States Navy personnel of World War II